Indian Renewable Energy Development Agency Limited (IREDA) is formed in 1987 as a Mini Ratna (Category – I) Government of India Enterprise under Government of India and administratively controlled by the Ministry of New and Renewable Energy (MNRE). The organisation is  formed for promoting, developing and extending financial assistance for setting up projects relating to new and renewable sources of energy and energy efficiency/conservation.

History and Objective 

Indian Renewable Energy Development Agency Limited is a Public Limited Government Company and a Non-Banking Financial Institution  formed for setting up projects relating to new and renewable sources of energy and energy efficiency/conservation with the motto: “ENERGY FOR EVER”. It is a Mini Ratna (Category – I) Government of India Enterprise with the objective of promoting, developing and extending financial assistance 
and under the administrative control of Ministry of New and Renewable Energy (MNRE).

Aims and Policies 

 Financing Renewable energy projects.

 Supporting green power capacity.

 Financing the setting up of solar manufacturing units.

Composition 

Indian Renewable Energy Development Agency Limited Chairman and Managing director is Pradip Kumar Das.

Related Articles 

 Renewable Energy

References

External links 
 Official Website

Renewable energy
Renewable energy companies by country
Renewable energy companies of India